The 2020 ATP Tour was the global elite men's professional tennis circuit organised by the Association of Tennis Professionals (ATP) for the 2020 tennis season. The 2020 ATP Tour calendar was composed of the Grand Slam tournaments (supervised by the International Tennis Federation (ITF)), the ATP Finals, the ATP Tour Masters 1000, the ATP Cup, the ATP Tour 500 series, the ATP Tour 250 series, and the Davis Cup (organised by the ITF). Also included in the 2020 calendar were the tennis events at the Next Generation ATP Finals, and the Laver Cup, neither of which distributed ranking points.
Several tournaments were suspended or postponed due to the COVID-19 pandemic, including the Summer Olympics in Tokyo. On 17 June 2020, ATP issued the revised calendar for Tour resumption.

Schedule
This is the complete schedule of events on the 2020 calendar.

January

February

March

April–July
No tournaments were played due to the COVID-19 pandemic (see affected tournaments below).

August

September

October

November

Affected tournaments
The COVID-19 pandemic affected many tournaments on both the ATP and WTA tours. Tournaments from 9 March to 21 August were either cancelled or postponed. The 2020 Summer Olympics were postponed to 2021 and the ATP rankings were also frozen over this period, with the last official rankings being released on March 16. The following tournaments were suspended or postponed due to the COVID-19 pandemic.

Statistical information
These tables present the number of singles (S), doubles (D), and mixed doubles (X) titles won by each player and each nation during the season, within all the tournament categories of the 2019 ATP Tour: the Grand Slam tournaments, the ATP Finals, the ATP Tour Masters 1000, the ATP Tour 500 series, and the ATP Tour 250 series. The players/nations are sorted by:
 Total number of titles (a doubles title won by two players representing the same nation counts as only one win for the nation);
 Cumulated importance of those titles (one Grand Slam win equalling two Masters 1000 wins, one undefeated ATP Finals win equalling one-and-a-half Masters 1000 win, one Masters 1000 win equalling two 500 events wins, one 500 event win equalling two 250 events wins);
 A singles > doubles > mixed doubles hierarchy;
 Alphabetical order (by family names for players).

Titles won by player

Titles won by nation

Titles information

The following players won their first main circuit title in singles, doubles or mixed doubles:
Singles
 Ugo Humbert – Auckland (draw)
 Casper Ruud – Buenos Aires (draw)
 Thiago Seyboth Wild – Santiago (draw)
 Miomir Kecmanović – Kitzbühel (draw)
 John Millman – Astana (draw)
 Jannik Sinner – Sofia (draw)
Doubles
 André Göransson – Pune (draw)
 Christopher Rungkat – Pune (draw)
 Roberto Carballés Baena – Santiago (draw)
 Alejandro Davidovich Fokina – Santiago (draw)
 Alex de Minaur – Cincinnati (draw)
 Félix Auger-Aliassime – Paris (draw)
 Hubert Hurkacz – Paris (draw)
Mixed doubles
 Nikola Mektić – Australian Open (draw)

The following players defended a main circuit title in singles, doubles, or mixed doubles:
Singles
 Novak Djokovic – Australian Open (draw)
 Gaël Monfils – Rotterdam Open (draw)
 Stefanos Tsitsipas – Marseille (draw)
 Rafael Nadal – French Open (draw)
Doubles
 Ben McLachlan – Auckland (draw)
 Horacio Zeballos – Buenos Aires (draw)
 Bob Bryan – Delray Beach (draw)
 Mike Bryan – Delray Beach (draw)
 Kevin Krawietz – French Open (draw)
 Andreas Mies – French Open (draw)

Best ranking
The following players achieved a career-high ranking this season in the top 50 (bold indicates players who entered the top 10 for the first time):
Singles

Doubles

ATP ranking
These are the ATP rankings and yearly ATP race rankings of the top 20 singles players, doubles players and doubles teams at the current date of the 2020 season. Rankings were frozen until the resumption of the 2020 season on 3 August 2020.

Singles

No. 1 ranking

Doubles

No. 1 ranking

Point distribution

Prize  money leaders

Best matches by ATPTour.com

Best 5 Grand Slam tournament matches

Best 5 ATP Tour matches

Retirements and comebacks

The following is a list of notable players (winners of a main tour title, and/or part of the ATP rankings top 100 in singles, or top 100 in doubles, for at least one week) who returned from retirement, announced their retirement from professional tennis, became inactive (after not playing for more than 52 weeks), or were permanently banned from playing, during the 2020 season:

  Bob and Mike Bryan (born 29 April 1978 in Wesley Chapel, Florida, United States) joined the professional tour in 1998 and reached a career-high ranking of No. 1 in doubles in September 2003. During the 2000s and the 2010s, the Bryan brothers, generally playing together, became the most successful doubles team in tennis history. Between 2003 and 2019, they spent a total of 438 weeks together at the No. 1 spot, with Bob spending an additional week alone at the top for a personal total of 439 weeks and Mike 68 more weeks alone (while Bob was sidelined due to injury) for a record total of 506 weeks. The Bryans also hold the record for most seasons ended together at No. 1, with 10 top finishes between 2003 and 2014. They hold the record for most doubles Grand Slam titles as a team, with 16 titles out of 30 finals: 6 Australian Opens (2006, 2007, 2009, 2010, 2011, 2013), 2 French Opens (2003, 2013) 3 Wimbledons (2006, 2011, 2013) and 5 US Opens (2005, 2008, 2010, 2012, 2014). After Bob was injured in 2018, Mike won 2 more Grand Slam titles with Jack Sock (the 2018 Wimbledon Championships and 2018 US Open) to hold alone the record for most doubles major titles with 18. The Bryans also won 4 year-end championships together (2003, 2004, 2009, 2014), with Mike winning one more alongside Sock (2018). They picked up 2 medals for the United States at the Summer Olympic Games, the bronze in Beijing (2008) and the gold in London (2012). With different partners, they won a total of 11 major mixed doubles titles (7 for Bob, 4 for Mike). On the ATP Tour, the Bryans collected a record of 118 titles together between 1999 and 2019 (with Mike winning an additional 5), including 39 ATP Tour Masters 1000 titles. They were part of the United States Davis Cup team from 2003 to 2018, winning the tournament once (2007). In November 2019, both of them announced their plans to retire after the 2020 US Open. However, they retired a week before the US Open amid safety concerns over the COVID-19 pandemic.
  Steve Darcis (born 13 March 1984 in Liège, Belgium) joined the professional tour in 2003 and reached a career-high ranking of No. 38 in singles in 2017. He won 2 singles titles on the ATP Tour and recorded his best results playing for the Belgium Davis Cup team, helping it reach both the 2015 and 2017 final in the competition. Darcis announced in October 2019 that the 2020 Australian Open would be his last professional tournament.
  Santiago Giraldo (born 27 November 1987 in Pereira, Colombia)
  Pere Riba (born 7 April 1988 in Barcelona, Spain)
  Jurgen Zopp (born 29 March 1988 in Tallinn, Estonia) On 18 December 2020 he announced his retirement from tennis.

See also

2020 WTA Tour
2020 ATP Challenger Tour
Association of Tennis Professionals
International Tennis Federation

References

Notes

External links
Association of Tennis Professionals (ATP) Tour official website
International Tennis Federation (ITF) official website

 
ATP Tour seasons
ATP Tour
ATP Tour
ATP Tour